Esteros is a 2016 international co-production drama film directed by Papu Curotto.

Storyline
Childhood friends Matías (played by Joaquín Parada as a boy, and Ignacio Rogers as an adult) and Jerónimo (played by Blas Finardi Niz as a boy, and Esteban Masturini as an adult) reach adolescence and experience sexual attraction to each other, before being separated by circumstances. Later, as young adults, they meet again, and the film follows themes of complicated relationships and sexual tensions, as well as issues of internalized homophobia.

References

External links 

2016 drama films
LGBT-related drama films
Brazilian drama films
Brazilian LGBT-related films
Argentine drama films
Argentine LGBT-related films
French drama films
French LGBT-related films
2016 LGBT-related films
2010s French films
2010s Argentine films